Télévision Suisse Romande ("Swiss Television Romandy") was a TV network with two channels: TSR 1 and TSR 2 (the two channels became RTS Un and RTS Deux after 2012). They were the main French language channels in Switzerland, part of SRG SSR (SRG SSR Idée Suisse before 2010). They provided content for TV5Monde. Radio Suisse Romande and Télévision Suisse Romande merged in 2010 to create Radio Télévision Suisse.

History 

The first evening programme in colour of Télévision Suisse Romande was broadcast in 1968. 1968 is also the first year where more than one million of Swiss households had a television.

Programmes 
The station can be received throughout Switzerland, and also in some neighboring countries.

Some of the popular programmes on TSR are:
 le 12:45, le 19:00 and le 19:30 – news broadcasts
 À Bon Entendeur – a consumer magazine programme (French)
 Temps Présent – a recent events programme (French)
 Passe-moi les jumelles (French)
 Nouvo – a news magazine about new technologies, media and communications (French)
 Infrarouge – a debating programme (French)
 TTC (http://www.tsr.ch/tsr/index.html?siteSect=390000 French)
 Mise Au Point (French)

See also
 Pierre-Alain Donnier
 Sibylle Blanc
 Television in Switzerland

References

External links

 

French-language television in Switzerland
French-language television networks
Swiss Broadcasting Corporation
Television networks in Switzerland